The Romanian Footballer of the Year, also known as the Nicolae Dobrin Trophy, is an annual association football award given by the Gazeta Sporturilor newspaper to the Romanian player adjudged to have been the best during a calendar year. The current holder is Florin Niță, who won the award for his performances in 2021 representing Sparta Prague.

It has been presented since 1966 and is currently named after Nicolae Dobrin, the first recipient of the award and one of Romania's most notable footballers. Gheorghe Hagi, the joint leading goalscorer of the national team alongside Adrian Mutu, has received the trophy a record of seven times.

Other annual honours handed out by Gazeta Sporturilor include the Foreign Player of the Year in Romania and the Romania Coach of the Year awards.

Winners

Breakdown of winners

By number of wins

By club

See also 
Gazeta Sporturilor Foreign Player of the Year in Romania
Gazeta Sporturilor Romania Coach of the Year
Gazeta Sporturilor Monthly Football Awards

References

External links 
Gazeta Sporturilor official website 
Romanian Footballer of the Year at Rec.Sport.Soccer Statistics Foundation

Romanian football trophies and awards
 
Awards established in 1966
1966 establishments in Romania
Annual events in Romania
Association football player non-biographical articles